The 1987 Independence Bowl was a college football postseason bowl game played on December 19, 1987, in Shreveport, Louisiana. It matched the Tulane Green Wave and the Washington Huskies of the  This was their first meeting and the first Independence Bowl for

Team

Tulane

In Mack Brown's final year as head coach, the Green Wave made their first bowl game in seven years.

Washington

In their thirteenth season under head coach Don James, the Huskies tied for third in the Pac-10. This was their tenth bowl game under James and ninth consecutive.

Game summary

First quarter
Washington: Tony Covington 3 run (Brownlee kick)

Second quarter
Tulane: Mitchell Price 44 punt return (Wiggins kick)
Tulane: John Koth  21 field goal
Washington: Bill Ames 5 pass from Chris Chandler (Brownlee kick) 
Washington: Darryl Franklin 5 pass from Chandler (Wiggins kick)

Third quarter
no scoring

Fourth quarter
Washington: Channing Wyles 41 field goal
Tulane: Safety, quarterback Conklin kneeled in end zone

Aftermath
Brown left after this game for North Carolina; Tulane's next bowl appearance was in 1998 the Liberty Bowl, where they capped off a perfect  season with a  win over BYU. In 1989, Washington beat Florida 34–7 in the Freedom Bowl, limiting Emmitt Smith to just 17 yards rushing.

Statistics

References

Independence Bowl
Independence Bowl
Tulane Green Wave football bowl games
Washington Huskies football bowl games
Independence Bowl
Independence Bowl